The 1986 Atlantic Coast Conference baseball tournament was the 1986 postseason baseball championship of the NCAA Division I Atlantic Coast Conference, held at Durham Athletic Park in Durham, North Carolina, from May 14 through 17.  defeated  in the championship game, earning the conference's automatic bid to the 1985 NCAA Division I baseball tournament.

Format and seeding 
Seven of the eight ACC teams participated in the double-elimination tournament. Duke school policy did not allow the team to play after final exams had ended on April 28.

Bracket and results

See also 
 College World Series
 NCAA Division I Baseball Championship
 Atlantic Coast Conference baseball tournament

References 

Tournament
Atlantic Coast Conference baseball tournament
Atlantic Coast Conference baseball tournament
Atlantic Coast Conference baseball tournament
Baseball competitions in Durham, North Carolina
College baseball tournaments in North Carolina